Barete is a comune and town in the province of L'Aquila in the Abruzzo region of Italy. It is located in the Gran Sasso e Monti della Laga National Park.

References

Cities and towns in Abruzzo